Shuangqiao station can refer to:
Shuangqiao station (Beijing Subway), a metro station in Beijing, China
Shuangqiao railway station, a railway station in Beijing, China
Shuangqiao station (Hangzhou Metro), a metro station in Hangzhou, China
Shuangqiao station  (Suzhou Rail Transit), a metro station on Line 5 (Suzhou Rail Transit) in Suzhou, China
Shuangqiao Road station, a metro station in Chengdu, China